Ethmia pala is a moth in the family Depressariidae. It is found along the west coast of Mexico.

The pattern on the forewings is divided by a strongly sinuate (wavy) line, with the rounded lobes from the dark costal half extending about halfway from the Cu to the dorsal margin, at the basal one-fourth and the beyond middle and nearly to the margin at the tornus. The ground color of the hindwings is uniform gray-brown.

References

Moths described in 1973
pala